A dawn god or goddess is a deity in a polytheistic religious tradition who is in some sense associated with the dawn. These deities show some relation with the morning, the beginning of the day, and, in some cases, become syncretized with similar solar deities.

Africa
In Egyptian mythology, Tefnut, in part of her being goddess of the morning dew.

Americas
In Sioux mythology, Anpao, the spirit of the dawn, has two faces.

Asia

Indo-European
 Hindu-Vedic – Ushas

Israel
Lucifer and Jesus of The Bible are both referred to as the “morning star” since in ancient time, the morning star had been referred to as an entity of great power.

Japan
Ame-no-Uzume-no-Mikoto (Uzume) is a Shinto spirit with a temperament very similar to Ushas and Eos.

Philippines

Munag Sumalâ: the golden Kapampangan serpent child of Aring Sinukuan; represents dawn
Tala: the Tagalog goddess of stars; daughter of Bathala and sister of Hanan; also called Bulak Tala, deity of the morning star, the planet Venus seen at dawn
Hanan: The Tagalog goddess of the morning; daughter of Bathala and sister of Tala 
Liwayway: the Tagalog goddess of dawn; a daughter of Bathala

Europe

Indo-European
 Proto-Indo-European – Hausos (reconstructed proto-goddess)
 Albanian – Afërdita, Prende
 Armenian – Ayg, Arshaluys
 Greek – Eos
 Germanic – Ēostre
 Hindu - Ushas
 Norse – Dellingr 
 Roman – Aurora (and later Mater Matuta)
 Slavic – Zorya
 Irish – Brigid
 Lithuanian – Aušra or Aušrinė
 Latvian – Austra

Non-Indo-European
 Etruscan – Thesan, Albina (possibly)
 Georgian – Dali

See also

Aurvandil
Proto-Indo-European religion
List of Lithuanian mythological figures
List of Philippine mythological figures
List of solar deities

References

External links

 
Lists of deities
Solar deities